George Cox (23 August 1911 – 30 March 1985) was an English first-class cricketer who played for Sussex. He was also a footballer who played for Arsenal and Fulham.

Career
Born in Warnham, Sussex, as a cricketer Cox was primarily an attacking right-handed batsman, also an occasional right-arm medium-pace bowler and in his youth a fine cover fielder. Cox played for Sussex and had a first-class career which started in 1931. He went on to play 455 first-class matches, making 22949 runs at an average of 32.92, that included 50 centuries, with a highest score of 234 not out.

Cox also played football for Arsenal, whom he joined in November 1933. Cox stayed at Highbury for the following three years, where he played predominantly in the Football Combination. In the Combination, Cox scored 53 times in 75 games for the Gunners. He played seven times for the first team, scoring once for the club.

In the summer of 1936, Cox moved to Fulham for a transfer fee of £150. After a sole season with Fulham, Cox then journeyed to Luton Town. It was at the Hatters that his footballing career ended.

He was a cricket coach at Sussex from 1960 to 1964.

Personal life
He was generally known as George Cox junior in order to distinguish him from his father George Cox senior, who was also a successful player for the same county. He was a notably witty conversationalist and letter writer. Cox died on 30 March 1985 in Burgess Hill, Sussex.

References

External links 

 This Cox is a Pippin by A. A. Thomson, 1961
 Obituary from Wisden Cricketers' Almanack, 1986 edition

1911 births
1985 deaths
English cricketers
People from Warnham
Sussex cricketers
English cricket coaches
English footballers
Association football forwards
Arsenal F.C. players
Fulham F.C. players
English Football League players
Royal Air Force cricketers
H. D. G. Leveson Gower's XI cricketers
North v South cricketers
L. C. Stevens' XI cricketers